Oberzeiring is a former municipality in the district of Murtal in Styria, Austria. Since the 2015 Styria municipal structural reform, it is part of the municipality Pölstal.

Tauern Wind Park 

The Tauern Wind Park near Oberzeiring was the highest wind farm in the world at 1900m elevation when it began operating in 2002. The Wind Park consists of 13 Vestas V66-1.75MW wind turbines, to be repowered by  nine V112-3.45 MW turbines. The operator provides guided tours.

Gallery

References 

Styria
Rottenmann and Wölz Tauern
Cities and towns in Murtal District